Military Armament Corporation is a defunct American manufacturer of small arms, co-founded by Gordon Ingram, an engineer and gun designer, and Mitchell WerBell, owner of  SIONICS, which manufactured gun sound suppressors. It is known for manufacturing the MAC-10 and MAC-11 machine pistols in the 1970s.

History
In 1969, Ingram joined SIONICS as a Chief Engineer.  WerBell added his patented silencer, manufactured by SIONICs to Ingram's machine pistol design, to create the MAC-10. The company focused on the military market, and attempted to sell the MAC-10 to the US Army for use in the Vietnam War. WerBell and Ingram demonstrated the MAC-10 to several units of the  US Army, and in 1970 convinced a group of investors, Quantum Corp, that it might replace the .45 M1911 pistol as the standard sidearm of the Army. The investors  formed a new company - Military Armament Corporation -  to make and sell this weapon. WerBell became president of the new company and Ingram Chief Engineer, but within a year, the investors had ousted both him and Ingram from the company. SIONICS was later absorbed by Military Armament Corporation.

It stopped producing the firearms in 1973, due to internal company politics, and filed for bankruptcy in 1975.

References

Defunct firearms manufacturers
Firearm manufacturers of the United States